Prasanna Pattnaik (born 1 June 1948) is an Indian politician and the first Bharatiya Janata Party (BJP) MLA of Odisha. He has been elected three times to the Odisha Legislative Assembly from Kamakhyanagar constituency.

He worked to establish the BJP in Odisha during the 1980s, and rejoined the BJP along with his wife Nalini Prabha Patnaik in 2014, to further establish BJP in the 2014 Odisha Assembly elections.

Early life 
Prasanna Pattnaik was born in a small village Bhuban in Dhenkanal District of Indian State Odisha (Then Orissa). His father was Narayana Pattnaik. His interest in politics started from his student life.

Political career
Prasanna Pattnaik started his political career as a student leader in the historic student movement of 1964 in Odisha. Thereafter, he joined Swatantra Party headed by Late R.N Singhdeo (the then Chief Minister of Odisha) where he was the President of Yuva Swatantra Party, Dhenkanal District and State Executive Member of Swatantra Party. After liquidation of Swatantra Party and merger with Lok Dal, Prasanna Pattnaik became the State executive member and District General Secretaryof Dhenkanal District.

He actively took part in total revolution headed by Late Jayaprakash Narayan known as JP Movement which took a momentum in 1974 and got arrested along with many leaders and this gave a start to his political career in Odisha Politics. He joined the total revolution of J.P. Movement in 1975 and was detained under MISA (and kept in Dhenkanal and Palahara Jail) and DIR. After the lifting of National Emergency, he was released from Jail and he joined Bharatiya Jana Sangha. Thenafter, the Janata Party was formed under the leadership of Late Chandrasekhar (Ex-Prime Minister of India). He contested for Janata Party and Won the Legislative Assembly Seat from Kamakhyanagar constituency in the year 1977 at the age of 28 years.

In 1980, Bharatiya Jana Sanga revived again as Bharatiya Janata Party and Prasanna Pattnaik became the National Executive Member of BJP under the leadership of Shri Atal Bihari Vajpayee. He was also the General Secretary of Odisha Unit. He played a vital role in establishing the party in Odisha by winning the only Legislative Assembly Seat for his party (Bharatiya Janata Party) from the same constituency, Kamakhayanagar in 1985 elections. Thus, he earned the distinction of being the First BJP MLA of Odisha and was the only BJP representative in the Odisha Legislative Assembly then. He was recognized by the Speaker of Odisha Legislative Assembly as the Leader of BJP. He has contributed to the education system of his village (Bhuban and kamakhyanagar) by founding many schools and colleges.

Later he joined Janata Dal under the leadership of Sri. Biju Patnaik. He was elected for the third time from the same constituency in the year 1990. After facing defeat in 1995 Assembly elections, he took a sabbatical from politics. During this time, he worked as a social worker for the development of kamakhyanagar and Bhuban. After a long gap, Prasanna Pattnaik returned to active politics by re-joining BJP along with his wife, Nalini Prabha Patnaik and hundreds of followers in 2014. He contested for BJP from Kamakhyanagar in 2014 Odisha Assembly Elections. Even after joining BJP in the last moment before the 2014 Odisha Assembly Elections, Prasanna Pattnaik helped BJP gain a commendable 8.18% more votes in comparison to the previous assembly elections. He is a permanent State Executive Member of BJP Odisha Unit. He continues to work to strengthen the position of BJP in Odisha.

Legislative history

References

External links
http://www.elections.in/orissa/assembly-constituencies/kamakhyanagar.html
http://www.bjpodisha.in/bjp-odisha-history/
http://www.elections.in/orissa/assembly-constituencies/1990-election-results.html
http://eci.nic.in/eci_main/electionanalysis/AE/S18/partycomp120.htm

1948 births
Living people
People from Dhenkanal district
Members of the Odisha Legislative Assembly
Bharatiya Janata Party politicians from Odisha
Biju Janata Dal politicians
Janata Dal politicians